Happi is a Hindi-language film directed by Bhavna Talwar and produced by Vistaar Film Fund & WSG Pictures. The film, made in black-and-white, stars Pankaj Kapoor, and is an homage to Charlie Chaplin as per the director. Pankaj Kapoor plays the part of a Chaplin-esque character. After being stuck in development hell, the film released on ZEE5 on 25 December 2019.

Plot 

Happi is a comedy drama that tells the amazing story of survival of a social misfit set in Mumbai. The film is all about a man, who is content with what he earns as his needs are few and thus, he is comfortable being a misfit. He earns by making people laugh as well as by singing at Cafe Bombay.

His life turns upside down and he is shattered as the same place is now getting revamped into 'Club Mumbai' – a hip, high class upmarket lounge. But he refuses to be beaten down by the circumstances and fights back with his self belief with an unlikely companion, a puppy.

Cast 

Pankaj Kapoor
Supriya Pathak
Hrishitaa Bhatt
Nakul Vaid
Manoj Pahwa
Raj Saluja
Farroukh Mehta
Sachin Gaikwad
Tejaswini Kolhapure (special appearance)

Production
The film, originally made in colour, was converted to black-and-white inspired by 2011 Academy Award for Best Picture winner The Artist as it suits the mood and theme of the film.

Music 
Ilaiyaraaja provided the film score for this film and the lyrics were penned by Jaideep Sahni and actor Kamalhassan has sung a song in this movie.

References

External links
 

2010s Hindi-language films
ZEE5 original films
Films scored by Ilaiyaraaja
2019 direct-to-video films
2019 films
Charlie Chaplin
Indian black-and-white films